The pink corydoras (Corydoras axelrodi) is a tropical freshwater fish belonging to the subfamily Corydoradinae of the family Callichthyidae. It originates in inland waters in South America, and is found in the Meta River basin in Colombia. A maximum body length of 4.2 cm has been reported. It was named in honor of pet-book publisher Herbert R. Axelrod (1927-2017), who helped collect type series and sent it to the Senckenberg Museum in Frankfurt, Germany.

See also
List of freshwater aquarium fish species

References

Corydoras
Taxa named by Fritz Rössel
Freshwater fish of Colombia
Fish described in 1962